Kalifornia is a 1993 film directed by Dominic Sena and starring Brad Pitt, Juliette Lewis, David Duchovny, and Michelle Forbes. Kalifornia may also refer to:

 "Kalifornia", a track from the Biker Boyz soundtrack
 "Kalifornia", a single from Above the Law's 1994 album Uncle Sam's Curse
 "Kalifornia", a track from Fatboy Slim's 1998 album You've Come a Long Way, Baby
 "Kalifornia", a single from Kashmir's 2005 album No Balance Palace
 "Kalifornia", a track from The Subways' 2008 album All or Nothing
 Kalifornia, a 1999 album by Ultra Bra
 Kalifornia (album), a 2012 album by Nasty Idols

See also 
California (disambiguation)